The Tashkurgan River (pinyin Tǎshíkù'ěrgàn hé) is a river in the Xinjiang Uyghur Autonomous Region of western China.  The Tashkurgan River runs through Tashkurgan Tajik Autonomous County and is one of the tributaries of the Yarkand River in the Tarim Basin.

The river is formed by the joining of several mountain streams originating in the Karakoram range and northern Hindu Kush mountains. It flows due north to Tashkurgan. Then it turns right flowing through the mountains and joins the Yarkand River.

References

Rivers of Xinjiang
Sites along the Silk Road
Tashkurgan Tajik Autonomous County